Anbalagan is an Indian surname. Notable people with the surname include:

G. Anbalagan, Indian politician
K. P. Anbalagan (born 1958), Indian politician 
S. Anbalagan, Indian politician 
V. Anbalagan, Indian politician 

Indian surnames